The fourth season of Dance Moms, an American dance reality television created by Collins Avenue Productions, began airing on January 1, 2014 on Lifetime's television network. A total of 32 official episodes and 2 special episodes (Guess Who's Coming to the Dance?, Dance Moms Cares Special) aired this season.

Overview
Miller fears her Junior Elite Competition team doesn't show enough drive and threatens them by hosting nationwide open auditions for a new team. Although on a winning streak, tension rises between Miller and long-time client Kelly Hyland, and Miller finds herself in definite need of new dancers. Meanwhile, Melissa relishes in her daughters' successes with Mackenzie's blossoming music career and Maddie embracing new opportunities to dance. On the 100th episode, Miller unveils her new "Select Ensemble" for the first time. At the very end of the season, Chloe and Christi decide to leave the ALDC.

Cast
The fourth season featured sixteen star billing cast members in the first seven episodes, and thirteen from episode eight onwards, with various other dancers and moms appearing throughout the season. This season is also the last to feature Brooke Hyland, Paige Hyland, and Chloe Lukasiak as part of the ALDC team as well as the first to feature Kalani Hilliker. (NOTE: Chloe only leaves the ALDC. She returns in season seven.)

Junior Elite Team
 Maddie Ziegler
 Mackenzie Ziegler
 Brooke Hyland 
 Paige Hyland 
 Nia Frazier
 Chloe Lukasiak
 Kendall Vertes
 Kalani Hilliker

Junior Elite Team Moms
 Melissa Gisoni
 Holly Hatcher-Frazier
 Jill Vertes
 Christi Lukasiak
 Kelly Hyland 
 Kira Girard

Select Ensemble Team Dancers
 Tea' Adamson, a contemporary & musical theatre dancer from Fort Myers, Florida. She was brought on the show to rival Mackenzie. She was on the show until the end of season 4, when the ensemble team disbanded and she was dismissed.
 Kamryn Beck, a lyrical & contemporary dancer from Ephrata, Pennsylvania. She was brought on the show to rival Chloe. She was on the show until the end of season 4, when the ensemble team disbanded and she was dismissed.
 Jade Cloud, an acro & contemporary dancer from Westfield, Massachusetts. She was brought on the show to rival Kalani. She was on the show until the end of season 4, when the ensemble team disbanded and she was dismissed. Jade is the first Native American dancer to be featured at ALDC and on Dance Moms.
 Ava Cota, a lyrical & contemporary dancer from Fenton, Michigan. She was brought on the team to rival Kendall. She danced with the team until she was kicked off by Abby on episode 26. After being kicked off the team, Ava competed with her mother's studio, JC's Broadway Dance Academy. She also competed as part of the Candy Apple's Dance Center for part of fifth and seventh seasons.
 Sarah Hunt, a lyrical & contemporary dancer from Pittsburgh. She was brought on the team to rival Mackenzie. She danced with the team for a week and was kicked off due to her mother's behavior. Afterwards, Sarah was trying to join both the Junior Elite and the ensemble teams, only for her mother's behavior getting her kicked off once again. After season 4, Sarah made an appearance in seasons 5 & 6. She has not been featured on the show again since.
 Sarah Reasons, an acro & lyrical dancer from Queen Creek, Arizona. She was brought on the team to rival Nia. She was on the team until the end of season 4, when the ensemble team disbanded and she was dismissed. After the disbandment of the ensemble team, Sarah made an appearance in season 5. She has not been featured on the show again since.

Junior Select Ensemble Team Moms
 Tami Adamson, mother of Tea.
 Jodi Gray, mother of Kamryn. 
 Loree Cloud, mother of Jade. Like Abby, she is a dance teacher and the owner of New England Dance and Gymnastic Centers. Prior to the show, Loree had been a longtime friend of Abby.
 Jeanette Cota, mother of Ava. Formerly a model, she is the former owner of JC's Broadway Dance Academy (BDA), which was located in Fenton. Jeanette closed the BDA permanently in 2017.
 Christy Hunt, mother of Sarah H. She was not liked by the other moms on the show due to her aggressive behavior.
 Tracey Reasons, mother of Sarah R.

Cast duration

Notes
 Key:  = featured in this episode
 Key:  = not featured in this episode
 Key:  = joins the Abby Lee Dance Company
 Key:  = leaves the Abby Lee Dance Company
 Key:  = leaves the show entirely
 Key:  = leaves the Abby Lee Dance Company and the show entirely

Episodes

Lawsuit
The episode "Big Trouble in the Big Apple" that aired on February 11, 2014 features the competition team at New York. During the final moments of the episode, Abby Lee Miller and dance mom Kelly Hyland get into a heated argument and ends with Kelly slapping Abby across the face and pulling her hair. Abby informs security and Kelly is removed from the building. Following the incident, Kelly filed a lawsuit against Abby for 5 million dollars, while Abby Lee Miller filed for assault against Hyland. Following the court proceedings, Hyland was banned from contacting Abby Lee Miller, including in forms of social media such as Twitter.

References

General references 
 
 
 

2014 American television seasons